Lion Express is an Indian News Paper.

History 
The Newspaper was launched in 2011 in Rajasthan, India.

Go to Lion Express in one click .

More than 4 lakh followers on Facebook 

It was founded by Biraj Mohan (बृजमोहन रामावत)  ,  in 2011 and published as Lion Express in Bikaner Rajasthan.

See also 
 List of newspapers in India

References 

Daily newspapers published in India
Hindi-language newspapers
2011 establishments in Rajasthan